Jennifer Coolidge (born August 28, 1961) is an American actress. She is primarily a character actress with roles in comedic film and television. Coolidge has received various accolades, including a Golden Globe Award, a Primetime Emmy Award, and two Screen Actors Guild Awards.

Coolidge had supporting roles in the American Pie film series (1999–2012) and the Legally Blonde film series (2001–2003). She has regularly collaborated with Christopher Guest on his mockumentary films, such as Best in Show (2000), A Mighty Wind (2003), For Your Consideration (2006), and Mascots (2016).  She has also appeared in the films A Cinderella Story (2004), Click (2006), Date Movie (2006), Epic Movie (2007), Promising Young Woman (2020), Single All the Way (2021), and Shotgun Wedding (2022).

On television, Coolidge has appeared in the sitcoms Joey (2004–2006), The Secret Life of the American Teenager (2008–2012), and 2 Broke Girls (2011–2017), and the drama series The Watcher (2022). She gained critical acclaim for starring as Tanya McQuoid, an insecure rich woman, in the HBO anthology series The White Lotus (2021–2022), winning a Primetime Emmy Award, a Golden Globe Award and two Screen Actors Guild Awards for the performance.

Early life
Coolidge was born in Boston, Massachusetts, to Gretchen (née Knauf) and Paul Constant Coolidge, a plastics manufacturer. She was raised in Norwell, Massachusetts. 
Coolidge played the clarinet and went to orchestra camp for three summers as a child. She attended Norwell High School, the Cambridge School of Weston, and pursued university studies at Emerson College in Boston and the American Academy of Dramatic Arts in New York City. During college, Coolidge wanted to become a dramatic actress like  Meryl Streep, but instead became a comedic character actress.

While in New York, Coolidge worked as a waitress in a restaurant alongside another aspiring actress, Sandra Bullock.

Career

1993–1999: Early career
Coolidge played supporting roles in several comedy movies and guest roles on television. She made her first appearance on television in the Seinfeld episode "The Masseuse". She had small roles appearing in such films as A Bucket of Blood, Plump Fiction, and A Night at the Roxbury.  She also voiced Luanne's beauty school teacher, Miss Kremzer, in a recurring role on King of the Hill. She worked with The Groundlings, an improv and sketch comedy troupe based in Los Angeles.

1999–2006: Breakthrough 

In 1999, Coolidge got her big break playing Jeanine Stifler, or "Stifler's mom" in American Pie. The film was a box-office hit and took in a gross worldwide revenue of $235,483,004. In 2001, she reprised her role in American Pie 2. Later in that same year, she had a supporting role in Legally Blonde as Paulette Bonafonté Parcelle the manicurist. Legally Blonde was a box-office hit, grossing US$96 million domestically. The film's box-office success led to her reprising the role in its 2003 sequel, Legally Blonde 2: Red, White & Blonde, but the movie was not as financially successful as the first film and generated mostly negative reviews. In 2003, she again played Jeanine Stifler in American Wedding.

In 2003, she played the protagonist's agent Luise in Testosterone filmed in Argentina starring David Sutcliffe as Dean Seagrave and Antonio Sabato, Jr. as Pablo.

In 2004, she had a supporting role in the romantic comedy A Cinderella Story playing Hilary Duff's character's vain, self-absorbed stepmother. The film went on to become a moderate box office hit despite negative critical reviews.

Coolidge nearly received the role of Lynette Scavo on Desperate Housewives, but it eventually went to Felicity Huffman.
From 2004 to 2006, Coolidge had a role in the NBC comedy series Joey as Joey Tribbiani’s oversexed agent Roberta "Bobbie" Morganstern. During its second season, she went from a recurring character to a more prominent role, appearing in 37 out of 46 episodes in the series. NBC officially canceled the series in May 2006, citing low ratings. 
She originally starred in an episode of Friends in its final season as Amanda, an obnoxious acquaintance whom Phoebe Buffay and Monica Geller try to shake off. Prior to her Friends appearance she was a regular on She TV, a short-lived sketch comedy that also featured Nick Bakay, Elon Gold, Simbi Khali, and Linda Kash. She also has appeared on According to Jim, playing Roxanne, Jim's sister and in an episode of Sex and the City, and on Frasier as Frederica, Martin Crane's new physical therapist. Coolidge also appeared in the children's comedy Slappy and the Stinkers, and as the voice of Aunt Fanny in the animated feature Robots. The film was accompanied by an original short animated film based on Robots, titled Aunt Fanny's Tour of Booty, in which she reprised her role.

In late 2005, Coolidge was invited to join the Academy of Motion Picture Arts and Sciences. In 2006, she guest starred on an episode of Top Chef, and played as Adam Sandler's wife's friend, Janine, in the comedy film Click. From 2000 to 2006 she played comic parts in the improv 
mockumentaries Best in Show, A Mighty Wind, and For Your Consideration, all directed by Christopher Guest.

2006–2011: Supporting roles in comedies and television work
She appeared in the 2006 film Date Movie as a spoof of Barbra Streisand's Meet the Fockers character. The film received unfavorable critic reviews and Rotten Tomatoes ranked the film 77th in the 100 worst reviewed films of the 2000s, with a rating of 6%. However, Variety did praise Coolidge for providing a few bright moments with a spot-on spoof of Barbra Streisand, albeit otherwise unimpressed describing the film as "padded and repetitious".

Epic Movie, released in 2007 and made by the same people behind Date Movie, was the first movie in which she received a starring role. In the film she played the "White Bitch" (the White Witch) of Gnarnia (Narnia), a lampoon of the Disney and Walden Media film The Chronicles of Narnia: the Lion, the Witch and the Wardrobe. A. O. Scott of The New York Times called the film "irreverent and also appreciative, dragging its satiric prey down to the lowest pop-cultural denominator" and added, "The humor is coarse and occasionally funny. The archly bombastic score ... is the only thing you might call witty. But happily, Jennifer Coolidge and Fred Willard show up ... to add some easy, demented class."

During 2007, Coolidge appeared on Thank God You're Here and The Closer, on TNT. In 2008, she guest starred on The Secret Life of the American Teenager as a call girl. In the second season, she was a frequently recurring character, now playing the fiancé of Ben's dad and future stepmother of Ben.  She also starred in the 2008 Lifetime Television film Living Proof. Coolidge appeared in the 2008 film Soul Men as Rosalee.

In 2009, Coolidge took a dramatic role in Bad Lieutenant: Port of Call New Orleans as Genevieve McDonagh. The film premiered on September 9, 2009, at the 66th Venice International Film Festival, and it opened in general release in the United States on November 20, 2009. Also In 2009, she starred alongside Heather Graham and Amber Heard in ExTerminators, a black comedy about a set of women who form their own "silent revolution", wreaking havoc on the abusive men in their lives.

In 2010, Coolidge appeared in another film starring Hilary Duff titled Beauty & the Briefcase, an ABC Family television film produced by Image Entertainment that originally aired on April 18, 2010. It was based on the novel Diary of a Working Girl by Daniella Brodsky. The film was released on DVD and Blu-ray in the US on February 8, 2011.

2011–2019: American Reunion, 2 Broke Girls, and other roles
Coolidge reprised her role as Stifler's Mom in an American Pie sequel which opened in North America on April 6, 2012.

In June 2011, Coolidge curated a Blake Nelson Boyd art show in New Orleans. 
In the same month Coolidge began to do standup comedy. She hosted the “Women in Film” at the Beverly Hills Hotel. It went over so well, that she decided to take an act on the road. Coolidge ended up doing shows all over the country and the world for two years, Scotland included. Coolidge told Australian radio show The Kyle & Jackie O Show that she would be touring Australia as part of her Yours for the Night stand-up tour.

In October 2011, Coolidge began a recurring role in the CBS sitcom 2 Broke Girls as Sophie Kaczyński, a Polish neighbor of the two lead characters. She was later promoted to main cast from season 2 up until the show's cancellation in 2017.

During 2013, additional voice cast members were announced for B.O.O.: Bureau of Otherworldly Operations, including Coolidge as Carol Sue, a transitions-relations officer. Film distributor 20th Century Fox set November 6, 2015, for the film's release date (which was moved a few months later up to September 25), In 2014, Los Angeles Times reported that the film had been delayed again, with no replacement release date set. It was reported the film's concept has gone back to development. Also in 2013, Coolidge and actress Megan Mullally joined the cast of Alexander and the Terrible, Horrible, No Good, Very Bad Day; Coolidge playing Ms. Suggs, the driving instructor. The film was released in North America on October 10, 2014.

The next year, she had a voice role in Hell and Back, and had a cameo in Alvin and the Chipmunks: The Road Chip. In 2016 she appeared in Mascots, directed by 
Christopher Guest. In 2017, Coolidge lent her voice to portray Mary Meh in The Emoji Movie. In 2018, Coolidge made an appearance in Ariana Grande's music video for her song "Thank U, Next".

2020–present: The White Lotus, and critical acclaim

In 2020, she starred in Like a Boss, the first studio comedy film of the 2020s, for Paramount Pictures, co-starring with Tiffany Haddish, Rose Byrne, and Salma Hayek. Coolidge had a supporting role in Emerald Fennell's directorial debut Promising Young Woman as the mother of Carey Mulligan's character, Cassie. The movie received universal acclaim upon release. 

In October 2020, Coolidge was cast as Tanya, a troubled woman on vacation, in Mike White's comedy-drama series The White Lotus and began filming shortly after in Hawaii. The show premiered in July 2021 and was widely praised, with Coolidge receiving critical acclaim and winning a Primetime Emmy Award for Outstanding Supporting Actress in a Limited or Anthology Series or Movie for her performance. Coolidge reprised her role for the second season.

In 2021, she starred in the Netflix Christmas romantic comedy Single All the Way alongside Michael Urie, Philemon Chambers, and Kathy Najimy. In 2022, Coolidge starred in Netflix's mini-series The Watcher along with Naomi Watts and Bobby Cannavale.

Personal life
Coolidge dated comedian Chris Kattan.

After having visited New Orleans up to ten times a year over ten years, Coolidge purchased a house there in 2005. Interior scenes from The Beguiled (2017)  were filmed in Coolidge's New Orleans mansion.

Her charitable work and activism includes supporting AIDS assistance and animal rights.

Coolidge is vegan and is passionate about animal rights causes. She has also adopted a dog named Chuy that was rescued from a meat factory in Korea.

Coolidge is a sixth cousin twice removed of U.S. President Calvin Coolidge.

Filmography

Film

Television

Video games

Music videos

Theatre

Awards and nominations

References

External links

 

1961 births
Living people
20th-century American actresses
21st-century American actresses
Actresses from Boston
Actresses from Massachusetts
American film actresses
American television actresses
American voice actresses
American women comedians
American Academy of Dramatic Arts alumni
Emerson College alumni
Comedians from Massachusetts
American LGBT rights activists
20th-century American comedians
21st-century American comedians
American people of English descent
American people of German descent
American people of Scottish descent
American people of Irish descent
AACTA Award winners
Best Supporting Actress Golden Globe (television) winners
Outstanding Performance by a Supporting Actress in a Miniseries or Movie Primetime Emmy Award winners
Outstanding Performance by a Female Actor in a Drama Series Screen Actors Guild Award winners
Outstanding Performance by an Ensemble in a Drama Series Screen Actors Guild Award winners